Sarıcallı (also, Sarıcalı and Saryjally) is a village in the Jabrayil District of Azerbaijan.  it is uninhabited.

References

External links

Populated places in Jabrayil District